HMT Empire Windrush, originally MV Monte Rosa, was a passenger liner and cruise ship launched in Germany in 1930. She was owned and operated by the German shipping line  in the 1930s under the name Monte Rosa. During World War II she was operated by the German navy as a troopship. At the end of the war, she was taken by the British Government as a prize of war and renamed the Empire Windrush. In British service, she continued to be used as a troopship until March 1954, when the vessel caught fire and sank in the Mediterranean Sea with the loss of four crewmen. HMT stands for "His Majesty's Transport" and MV for "Motor Vessel".

In 1948, Empire Windrush brought one of the early, large groups of postwar West Indian immigrants to the United Kingdom, carrying 1,027 passengers and two stowaways on a voyage from Jamaica to London. 802 of these passengers gave their last country of residence as somewhere in the Caribbean: of these, 693 intended to settle in the United Kingdom. 

Windrush was not the first ship to carry a large group of West Indian people to the United Kingdom, as two other ships has arrived the previous year. But Windrush's 1948 voyage became very well-known; British Caribbean people who came to the United Kingdom in the period after World War II, including those who came on other ships, are sometimes referred to as the Windrush generation.

Background and description

During the 1920s, Hamburg Süd believed there would be a lucrative business in carrying German emigrants to South America (see German Argentine). The first two ships (MV Monte Sarmiento and MV Monte Olivia) were built for that purpose with single-class passenger accommodation of 1,150 in cabins and 1,350 in dormitories. In the event, the emigrant trade was less than expected and the two ships were repurposed as cruise ships, operating in Northern European waters, the Mediterranean and around South America.

This proved to be a great success. Until then, cruise holidays had been the preserve of the rich. But by providing modestly priced cruises, Hamburg Süd was able to profitably cater to a large new clientele. Another ship was commissioned to cater for the demand – the MV Monte Cervantes. However, she struck an uncharted rock and sank after only two years in service. Despite this, Hamburg Süd remained confident in the design and quickly ordered two more ships, the MV Monte Pascoal and the MV Monte Rosa.

Engines and machinery
The five Monte-class vessels were diesel-powered motor ships. At the time, the use of diesel engines was highly unusual in ships of this size, which would have been typically steam-powered. The first two to be launched  Monte Sarmiento and Monte Olivia were in fact the first large diesel-powered passenger ships to see service with a German operator. The use of diesel engines reflected the experience Blohm & Voss had gained by building diesel-powered U-boats during World War I.

They were single-reduction geared in pairs to two propellers.

Electrical power was initially provided by three, 350-kW DC electric generators, powered by internal combustion engines and installed in the engine room; a fourth generator was added in 1949. There was also an emergency generator outside the engine room. The ship also carried two Scotch marine boilers to produce high-pressure steam for some auxiliary machinery. These could be heated either by burning diesel fuel or by using the hot exhaust gases from the main engines.

Naming
The Monte-Class ships were named after mountains in Europe or South America. Monte Rosa was named after Monte Rosa, a mountain massif located on the Swiss-Italian border and the second-highest mountain in the Alps.

The ship was renamed in British service. Merchant ships in service with the United Kingdom Government during and after World War 2 had names prefixed with the word Empire. These vessels were known as Empire ships and numbered around 1,300. Windrush was one of around sixty empire ships that were named after British rivers. Empire Windrushs namesake, the River Windrush is a small tributary of the Thames, that flows through the Cotswolds towards Oxford.

The ship's designation prefix was also changed, from "MV" (Motor Vessel) to "HMT". This was used for British troopships and could stand for "His Majesty's Troopship", "His Majesty's Transport" or "Hired Military Transport". Some official documents, such as the enquiry report into the ship's loss, used  "MV Empire Windrush" instead of "HMT".

Official Numbers are ship identifier numbers assigned to merchant ships by their country of registration. Each country developed its own official numbering system, some on a national and some on a port-by-port basis, and the formats have sometimes changed over time. National Official Numbers are different from IMO Numbers. Flag states still use national systems, which also cover those vessels not subject to the IMO regulations. Monte Rosa had the German Official Number 1640. She used the Maritime call sign RHWF until 1933 and then DIDU until 1945. When the ship sank in 1954 she had the British Official Number 181561.

Early history
Monte Rosa was launched on 13 December 1930 and was delivered in early 1931 to Hamburg Süd. After sea trials, she departed from Hamburg on her first voyage to South America on 28 March, arriving back on 22 June.

Monte Rosa's entry into service came just as the Great Depression was causing a serious downturn in Hamburg Süd's cruise business. It was not until 1933 that this picked up again, when the older ships, Monte Sarmiento and Monte Olivia reverted to their original role of carrying immigrants to South America while Monte Pascoal and Monte Rosa were used for cruises, to Norway and the United Kingdom, Monte Rosa also continued to carry  immigrants to South America, making more than 20 return-trips before the outbreak of World War II.

After the Nazi regime came to power in Germany in 1933, the ship was used by the party to help spread its ideology. She was operated as part of the state-owned  ('Strength through Joy') programme, which provided leisure activities and cheap holidays.

When visiting South America, the ship was used to spread Nazi ideology among the German-speaking community there. When in port in Argentina, she hosted Nazi rallies for German-Argentine people. In 1933, the new German ambassador, arrived in Argentina on the Monte Rosa. He disembarked in front of an enthusiastic crowd wearing an SS uniform; he would spend his time in office actively proselytising Nazi ideology. The ship was also used as a venue for Nazi gatherings when docked in London.

Monte Rosa ran aground off Thorshavn, Faroe Islands, on 23 July 1934, but was refloated the next day. In 1936, the ship made a rendezvous at sea with the airship LZ 127 Graf Zeppelin. During the manoeuvre, a bottle of champagne was hoisted from the Monte Rosa to the airship.

German World War II service
At the start of World War II, Monte Rosa was allocated for military use. She was used as a barracks ship at Stettin, then as a troopship for the invasion of Norway in April 1940. She was later used as an accommodation and recreational ship attached to the battleship Tirpitz, stationed in the north of Norway, from where Tirpitz and her flotilla attacked the Allied convoys en route to Russia.

In November 1942, she was one of several ships used for the deportation of Norwegian Jewish people. The ship made two trips from Oslo to Denmark on the 19th and the 26th of November, carrying a total of 46 people. They included the Polish-Norwegian businessman and humanitarian Moritz Rabinowitz. Of the 46, all but two were murdered at Auschwitz concentration camp. In September 1943, the ship was to be used for the deportation of Danish Jewish people. However the German chief of sea transport at Aarhus in Denmark, together with Monte Rosa's captain, conspired to prevent this by falsely reporting serious engine trouble to the German High Command. This action may have contributed to the Rescue of the Danish Jews.

In September 1943, the Tirpitz was badly damaged by British X-class submarines at Altafjord in Norway, during Operation Source. The Germans were unwilling to risk moving the ship to a German dockyard for repair, so in October Monte Rosa was used to carry hundreds of civilian workers and engineers to Altafjord where they would repair the Tirpitz in situ. During this time, Monte Rosa was docked alongside the battleship to act as accommodation for the workers.

Air attack

During the winter of 1943–1944, Monte Rosa continued to shuttle between Norway and Germany. On 30 March 1944, she was attacked by British and Canadian Bristol Beaufighters. The strike was mounted for the explicit purpose of sinking her after British reconnaissance had obtained details of the ship's movements. The ship was travelling south, escorted by two flak ships, a destroyer and by German fighters. The attacking force consisted of nine aircraft from Royal Air Force (RAF) 144 Squadron, five of which carried torpedoes; and nine aircraft from Royal Canadian Air Force (RCAF) 404 Squadron, all armed with armour-piercing RP-3 rockets.

The attack took place close to the Norwegian island of Utsira. The RCAF and RAF crews claimed two torpedo hits on Monte Rosa; the ship was also struck by eight rockets and by cannon fire. One German Messerschmitt Bf 110 fighter was shot down and two 404 Squadron Beaufighters were lost; the two crew of one aircraft were killed. The crew of the other (one of whom was the squadron commanding officer) survived to become prisoners of war. Despite her damage, Monte Rosa was able to reach Aarhus in Denmark on 3 April.

Sabotage attack

In June 1944, Max Manus and  Gregers Gram, members of Norwegian Independent Company 1 (a British Army sabotage and resistance unit composed of Norwegians), attached limpet mines to Monte Rosas hull while the ship was in Oslo harbour. They had learned the ship was to carry 3,000 German troops back to Germany and their purpose was to sink her during the trip. The pair had twice bluffed their way into the dock area by posing as electricians, then hid for three days as they waited for the ship to arrive. After it docked, they paddled out to her from their hiding place on an inflatable rubber boat and attached their mines. The mines detonated when the ship was near Øresund, damaging the hull; she remained afloat and returned to harbour under her own power.

Later wartime service

In September 1944, the vessel was damaged by another explosion, possibly from a mine. , a Norwegian boy with German parents who was being forcibly taken to Germany, was one of those on board when this happened. In his 2008 memoirs, he wrote that as well as German troops, the vessel was carrying Norwegian women with young children, who were being taken to Germany as part of the  programme. He notes the explosion happened at 5 am, and states that around 200 on board were trapped and drowned as the ship's captain closed the watertight bulkhead doors to control flooding and stop the ship from sinking.

On 16 February 1945, Monte Rosa was damaged by a mine explosion near the Hel Peninsula in the Baltic, With a flooded engine room, the ship was towed to the German-occupied Polish port of Gdynia for temporary repairs. The ship was then towed to Copenhagen, carrying 5,000 German refugees who were fleeing from the advancing  Red Army. She was taken to Kiel in May 1945, and was there seized by British forces as a prize of war.

Postwar British service
In 1947, Monte Rosa was assigned to the British Ministry of Transport and registered as a British vessel.

By this time, she was the only survivor of the five Monte-class ships. Monte Cervantes sank near Tierra del Fuego in 1930. Two ships were sunk in Kiel harbour by separate wartime air-raids, Monte Sarmiento in February 1942 and Monte Olivia in April 1945. Monte Pascoal was damaged by an air-raid on Wilhelmshaven in February 1944; in 1946 she was filled with chemical bombs and scuttled by the British in the Skagerrak.
Monte Rosa was renamed HMT Empire Windrush on 21 January 1947, for use on the Southampton–Gibraltar–Suez–Aden–Colombo–Singapore–Hong Kong route, with voyages extended to Kure in Japan after the start of the Korean War. The vessel was operated for the British Government by the New Zealand Shipping Company, and made one voyage only to the Caribbean before resuming normal trooping voyages.

West Indian immigrants

In 1948, Empire Windrush, which was en route from Australia to Britain via the Atlantic, docked in Kingston, Jamaica, to pick up servicemen who were on leave. The British Nationality Act 1948, giving the status of citizenship of the United Kingdom and Colonies (CUKC status) to all British subjects connected with the United Kingdom or a British colony, was going through parliament, and some Caribbean migrants decided to embark "ahead of the game". Prior to 1962, the UK had no immigration control for CUKCs, who could settle indefinitely in the UK without restrictions.

The ship was far from full, and so an opportunistic advertisement was placed in a Jamaican newspaper,  The Daily Gleaner, offering cheap transport on the ship for anybody who wanted to travel to the UK. Many former servicemen took this opportunity to return to Britain with the hopes of finding better employment, including, in some cases, rejoining the RAF; others decided to make the journey just to see what the "mother country" was like. One passenger later recalled that demand for tickets far exceeded the supply, and that there was a long queue to obtain one.

Passengers on board
A commonly given figure for the number of West Indian immigrants on board the Empire Windrush is 492, based understandably on news reports in the media at the time, which variously announced that "more than 400", "430" or "500" Jamaican men had arrived in Britain. However, the ship's records, kept in the United Kingdom National Archives, indicate conclusively that 802 passengers gave their last place of residence as a country in the Caribbean.

The ship also carried 66 people whose last country of residence was Mexico – they were a group of Polish people who had been detained and transported to Siberia by the Soviets after the Soviet invasion of Poland in 1939, but had escaped and made their way to Mexico via India and the Pacific. Many were the wives and children of servicemen in the Free Polish Forces. They had been granted permission to settle in the United Kingdom under the terms of the Polish Resettlement Act 1947, and the Empire Windrush had called at Tampico, Mexico to pick them up. One of them later recalled they were accommodated in cabins below the waterline, only allowed on-deck in escorted groups and were kept segregated from the other passengers.

Of the other passengers, 119 were from Britain and 40 from other parts of the world.

Among West Indian passengers was Sam Beaver King, who was travelling to the UK to rejoin the RAF. He would later help found the Notting Hill Carnival and become the first black Mayor of Southwark. There were also the calypso musicians Lord Kitchener, Lord Beginner, Lord Woodbine and Mona Baptiste. Jamaican artist and master potter Cecil Baugh was also among the passengers.

The non-Caribbean people on the ship included serving RAF officer, Sierra Leonean John Henry Clavell Smythe, acting as a welfare-officer; he would go on to become Attorney General of Sierra Leone. Another passenger was Nancy Cunard, English writer and heiress to the Cunard shipping fortune, who was on her way back from Trinidad.

One of the stowaways was a woman called as Evelyn Wauchope, a 39-year-old dressmaker. She was discovered seven days out of Kingston. A whip-round was organised on board ship, raising £50 – enough for the fare and £4 pocket money for her.

Arrival
The arrival of Empire Windrush was a notable news event. Even when the ship was in the English Channel, the Evening Standard dispatched an aircraft to photograph her from the air, printing the story on the newspaper's front page. The ship docked at the Port of Tilbury, near London, on 21 June 1948 and the 1,027 passengers began disembarking the next day. This was covered by newspaper reporters and by Pathé News newsreel cameras. The name Windrush, as a result, come to be used as shorthand for West Indian migration, and by extension for the beginning of modern British multiracial society.

The purpose of Windrushs voyage had been to transport service personnel. The additional arrival of civilian, West Indian immigrants was not expected by the British government, and not welcome. George Isaacs, the Minister of Labour, stated in Parliament that there would be no encouragement for others to follow their example. Three days before the ship arrived, Arthur Creech Jones, the Secretary of State for the Colonies, wrote a Cabinet memorandum noting that the Jamaican Government could not legally prevent people from departing, and the British government could not legally prevent them from landing. However, he stated that the government was opposed to this immigration, and all possible steps would be taken by the Colonial Office and the Jamaican Government to discourage it. Despite this, the first legislation controlling immigration was not passed until 1962.

Those who had not already arranged accommodation were temporarily housed in the Clapham South deep shelter in south-west London, less than a mile away from the Coldharbour Lane Employment Exchange in Brixton, where some of the arrivals sought work. The stowaways served brief prison sentences, but were eligible to remain in the United Kingdom on their release.

Many of Empire Windrushs passengers only intended to stay for a few years but, although a number did return, the majority remained to settle permanently. Those born in the West Indies who settled in the UK in this migration movement over the following years are now typically referred to as the "Windrush Generation".

Earlier voyages

While the 1948 voyage of the Windrush is well-known, it was not the first ship to carry West Indian people to the United Kingdom after World War 2. On 31 March 1947, the SS Ormonde docked at Liverpool after sailing from Jamaica with 241 passengers, including 11 stowaways. One of Ormondes passengers was Ralph Lowe, the father of author and poet Hannah Lowe. On arrival, the stowaways were tried at Liverpool Magistrates Court. The court sentenced them to one day in prison, which effectively meant their immediate release.

On 21 December 1947, the SS Almanzora docked at Southampton with 200 people on board. As on the Windrush many were former service personnel who had served in the RAF during World War 2.

Later service
In May 1949, Empire Windrush was on a voyage from Gibraltar to Port Said when a fire broke out on board. Four ships were put on standby to assist if the ship had to be abandoned. Although the passengers were placed in the lifeboats, they were not launched and the ship was subsequently towed back to Gibraltar.

In February 1950, the ship was used to transport the last British troops stationed in Greece back to the United Kingdom, embarking the First Battalion of the Bedfordshire and Hertfordshire Regiment at Thessaloniki on 5 February, and further troops and their families at Piraeus. British forces had been in Greece since 1944, fighting on the side of the Kingdom of Greece in the Greek Civil War.

Holchu was later boarded by the crew of a British cargo ship, the Ranee, alerted by Windrushs warning. They found no trace of the five crew and the vessel  was towed to Colombo. Holchu was carrying a cargo of rice and was in good condition aside from a broken mast. Adequate supplies of food, water and fuel were found, and a meal had been prepared in the ship's galley. The fate of Holchus crew remains unknown and the incident is cited in several works on Ufology and the Bermuda Triangle.

In June 1953, Windrush was one of the ships that took part in the Fleet review that marked the Coronation of Queen Elizabeth II.

Last voyage and sinking

Empire Windrush set off from Yokohama, Japan, in February 1954 on what proved to be her final voyage. She called at Kure and was to sail to the United Kingdom, calling at Hong Kong, Singapore, Colombo, Aden and Port Said. Her passengers included recovering wounded United Nations veterans of the Korean War, and some soldiers from the Duke of Wellington's Regiment who had been wounded at the Third Battle of the Hook in May 1953.

However, the voyage was plagued with engine breakdowns and other defects, including a fire after the departure from Hong Kong. It took 10 weeks to reach Port Said. There, a group of 50 Royal Marines from 3 Commando Brigade came on board and ship left port for the last time.

On board were 222 crew and 1,276 passengers, including military personnel and some women and children, dependents of some of the military personnel. With 1498 people on board, the ship was almost completely full as it was certified to carry 1541.

Accidental fire

At around 6:15 am on Sunday 28 March, there was a sudden explosion and fierce fire in the engine room that killed the third engineer, two other members of the engine-room crew and the first electrician; a fifth crew member in the engine room and one in the boiler room, both greasers, managed to escape.

The ship quickly lost all electrical power as the four main electrical generators were located in the burning engine room; the backup generator was started, but problems with the main circuit breaker made its power unusable. The emergency generator powered the ship's emergency lighting, bilge pump, fire pump and the radio.

The ship did not have a sprinkler system. The chief officer heard the explosion from the ship's bridge and assembled the ship's firefighting squad, who happened to be on deck at the time doing routine work. However they were only able to fight the fire for a few minutes before the loss of electrical power stopped the water pumps that fed their fire hoses. The second engineer was able to enter the engine room by wearing a smoke hood, but was unable to close a watertight door that might have contained the fire. Attempts to close all watertight doors using the controls on the bridge had also failed.

Rescue operations

At 6:23 am, the first distress calls were transmitted; further SOS calls used the emergency radio transmitter as electrical power had been lost. The order was given to wake the passengers and crew and assemble them at their emergency stations, but the ship's public address system was not working, nor were its air and steam whistles, so the order had to be transmitted by word of mouth.
At 6:45 am, all attempts to fight the fire were halted and the order was given to launch the lifeboats, with the first ones away carrying the women and children on board and the ship's cat.

While the ship's 22 lifeboats could accommodate all on board, thick smoke and the lack of electrical power prevented many of them from being launched. Each set of lifeboat davits accommodated two lifeboats and without electrical power, raising the wire ropes to lower the second boat was an arduous and slow task. With fire spreading rapidly, the order was given to drop the remaining boats into the sea. In the end, only 12 lifeboats were launched.

Many of the crew and troops abandoned the ship by climbing down ladders or ropes and jumping into the sea, after first throwing overboard any loose items to hand that would float Some were picked up by Windrush's lifeboats, others by a boat from the first rescue ship, which reached the scene at 7.00 am. The last person to leave Windrush was the chief officer at 7:30 am. Although some people were in the sea for two hours, all were rescued and the only fatalities were the four crew killed in the engine room.

A Royal Air Force Avro Shackleton from 224 Squadron assisted in the rescue.

The rescue vessels took the passengers and crew to Algiers, where they were cared for by the French Red Cross and the French Army.  They were taken to Gibraltar by the aircraft carrier , and from there returned to the United Kingdom by air.

Salvage attempt and sinking

The fire was still burning fiercely more than a day after it started, but a party from Saintes managed to get on board and attach a tow cable. The bodies of the four men killed were not recovered, and were lost when the ship sank.

Inquiry into the sinking
An inquiry into the sinking of Empire Windrush was held in London between the 21 June and 7 July 1954. John Vickers Naisby, the wreck commissioner lead the enquiry.

Sidney Silverman, lawyer and Member of Parliament, represented the interests of the ship's crew, and during the proceedings tried to show that Windrush was in an unsafe state and was not fit to be at sea - one of the four men killed in the accident, Engineer Leslie Pendleton, had written several letters to his father describing the ship's poor state of repair, many breakdowns, and a previous fire. These were submitted to the enquiry as evidence.
 
No firm cause for the fire was established, but it was thought the most likely cause was that corrosion in one of the ship's funnels, or uptakes, may have led to a panel failing, causing incandescently hot soot to fall into the engine room, where it damaged a fuel oil or lubricating oil supply pipe and ignited the leaking oil. An alternative theory was that a fuel pipe fractured and deposited fuel oil onto a hot exhaust pipe. The enquiry also concluded that Windrush was seaworthy at the time she caught fire.

It was thought the rapid failure of the ship's three main electrical generators was due to the fire consuming all the oxygen in the engine-room and stopping the internal combustion engines that powered them. The rapid depletion of oxygen and the fire's noxious gasses were thought to have also caused the deaths of the four engine room crew.

As the ship was government property, she was not insured.

Legacy

In 1954, several of the military personnel on board Empire Windrush during her final voyage received decorations for their role in the evacuation of the burning ship. A military nurse was awarded the Royal Red Cross for her role in evacuating the patients under her care.

In 1998, an area of public open space in Brixton, London, was renamed Windrush Square to commemorate the 50th anniversary of the arrival of Empire Windrushs West Indian passengers. To commemorate the "Windrush Generation", in 2008, a Thurrock Heritage plaque was unveiled at the London Cruise Terminal at Tilbury. This chapter in the boat's history was also commemorated, although fleetingly only, in the Pandemonium sequence of the Opening Ceremony of the Games of the XXX Olympiad in London, 27 July 2012. A small replica of the ship plastered with newsprint was the facsimile representation in the ceremony.

In 2020, a fund-raising effort was begun for a project to recover one of the ship's anchors as a monument to the people of the Windrush generation.

See also
  – list of ships named Monte Rosa
 Empire Orwell, formerly the German cargo liner TS Pretoria, captured and converted into a British troopship.
 SS Empire Fowey, formerly the German liner SS Potsdam, captured and converted into a British troopship.
 Windrush – a 1998 BBC documentary series about the first postwar West Indian immigrants to the UK
 Windrush Day, an annual celebration of the contribution of immigrants to British society. Held on the 22 June, the day the Empire Windrush's passengers disembarked in 1948.

Notes

References

Bibliography
 Sea Breeze, various contemporary issues.
 The Daily Express, 20 June 1954, for a report of the Strength Through Joy programme, archived in WO 32/15643 at the Public Record Office and the British Library Newspaper Library, London.
 Board of Trade Inquiry Report, archived as BT 239/56 at the Public Record Office.
 War Office files on the loss, archived as WO 32/15643 at the Public Record Office, including contemporary press clippings.
 Report of the British Consul in Algiers for the Foreign Office, archived at the Public Record Office as FO 859/26, including recommendation to invite the Mayor of Algiers to London, an invoice for services rendered by the French Army in Algeria, a full passenger list, and letters from passengers.

External links
 Original blueprints of Monte Rosa by Blohm and Voss, 1931. At archive.org.

 Photographs taken onboard Monte Rosa while in passenger service pre-World War 2.
 Photograph of Monte Rosa in German wartime service (1943); photograph number 89096, United States Holocaust Memorial Museum.

1948 voyage of the Windrush
 Passenger List from the Public Record Office
 "Windrush - the Passengers", Mike Phillips, BBC History, 10 March 2011* Windrush settlers arrive in Britain, 1948 – treasures of The National Archives (UK).
 Windrush settlers arrive in Britain, 1948 – Transcript
 Board of Trade 'Inwards passenger lists, 1948' Subseries within BT 26 Record Summary – held at The National Archives (UK), Kew, Richmond, Surrey.
 Through My Eyes website – Imperial War Museum Online Exhibition – Videos, pictures and interviews from the museum's archives showing the West Indian contribution to the World War II effort

 Windrush: Arrival 1948 Passenger List - Goldsmiths College, University of London
 Film by Youmanity tracing the arrival of a Jamaican family aboard Empire Windrush
 Oral history of passengers on the Windrush from BBC History

History of immigration to the United Kingdom
Jamaican diaspora
Korean War
History of Thurrock
Shipwrecks in the Mediterranean Sea
Passenger ships of Germany
Ocean liners
Troop ships of the United Kingdom
Black British history
Empire ships
1930 ships
20th century in the United Kingdom
Maritime incidents in 1934
Maritime incidents in 1954
Troop ships of Germany
First arrivals